Gangsters: America's Most Evil is a documentary television series that airs on Reelz which profiles notorious criminals whose crimes involve murder, drug trafficking, racketeering and human trafficking. Most, if not all of, the criminals profiled in this series were either brought to justice by local, state, and federal law enforcement or were killed as a part of their criminal enterprises.

Gangsters debuted on July 20, 2012 on Bio and is produced by Asylum Entertainment in association with A+E Networks (Bio's parent company). Season 4 aired first-run on Reelz and episodes from that season are labeled "Reelz Original" in the closing credits.

Episode Guide

Season One

Season Two

Season Three

Season Four

Season Five

Season Six

References

2012 American television series debuts
2017 American television series endings
2010s American documentary television series
2010s American crime television series
Television series about organized crime
Works about organized crime in the United States